The Purépecha Empire, also known by the term Iréchikwa, was a polity in pre-Columbian Mexico. Its territory roughly covered the geographic area of the present-day Mexican state of Michoacán, as well as parts of Guanajuato, Guerrero, and Jalisco. At the time of the Spanish conquest, it was the second-largest state in Mesoamerica. The state is also known as the Tarascan Empire, an exonym often considered pejorative by the Purépecha people.

The empire was founded in the early 14th century and lost its independence to the Spanish in 1530. In 1543 it officially became the governorship of Michoacán, from the Nahuatl exonym for the Purépecha Empire, Michhuahcān from michin ("fish"), -huah ("possessor of"), and -cān ("place of") and means "place of fishers."

The Purépecha Empire was constituted of a network of tributary systems and gradually became increasingly centralized, under the control of the ruler of the empire called the Irecha or Cazonci. The Purépecha capital was located at Tzintzuntzan on the banks of Lake Pátzcuaro and, according to Purépecha oral tradition, was founded by the first Cazonci Tariácuri and dominated by his lineage, the "Wakúsïcha" ("Eagles" in Purépecha language). The largest city before the inception of the empire may have been Angamuco, extensive ruins of which were discovered in 2012 using LiDAR technology.

The Purépecha Empire was contemporary with and an enemy of the Aztec Empire, against which it fought many wars. The Purépecha Empire blocked Aztec expansion to the northwest, fortifying and patrolling their frontiers with the Aztecs, possibly developing the first truly territorial state of Mesoamerica.

Due to its relative isolation within Mesoamerica, the Purépecha Empire had many cultural traits completely distinct from those of the Mesoamerican cultural group.  It is particularly noteworthy for being among the few Mesoamerican civilizations to use metal for tools, and even weapons.

Etymology and definitions
The word "Purépecha" in modern usage is the Hispanicized form of the then and still used term "P'orhépicha", meaning "commoner/s" in the Purépecha language. The term is derived from the root "P'orhe-", meaning "to visit" or "to go", alluding to strolling of the people to and from their daily duties. Another word by which the Purépecha people have been called is "Tarascan", from Spanish "Tarasco" derived from the Purépecha word "Tarhaskwa", meaning "parent-in-law/child-in-law". This term is pejorative to the Purépecha when not used in its correct definition.

Ethnic groups
The empire included different groups, primarily Purépecha people and additionally Matlazincas, Tecos, Mazahuas, Otomíes, Chontales, Nahuas.

The people of the Iréchikwa were mostly of Purépecha ethnic affiliation but also included other ethnic groups such as the Nahua, Otomi, Matlatzinca and Chichimec. These ethnic groups were gradually assimilated into the Purépecha majority group.

Geography and lithic occupation

The territory that would eventually form the setting of the Purepecha Empire is the high volcanic region constituting the western extension of the Mexican Mesa Central, in between two large rivers: the Lerma and Balsas Rivers.  Including temperate, subtropical and tropical climate zones, it is dominated by Cenozoic volcanic mountains and lake basins above 2000 meters (6500 feet) altitude, but also includes lower land in the southwestern coastal regions. Most common soil types in the central plateau are young volcanic andosols,  luvisols and less fertile acrisols.  The vegetation is mainly pine, pine-oak and fir. Human occupation has focused on the lake basins, which are abundant in resources. In the north, near the Lerma river, there are obsidian resources and thermal springs. The Iréchikwa was centered around the Lake Pátzcuaro basin.

History of the Iréchikwa

Early archaeological evidence
The Purepecha area has been inhabited at least since the early Pre-classic period.  Early lithic evidence from before 2500 BC, like fluted points and stone utensils are found at some megafauna kill sites. The earliest radio-carbon dates of archeological sites fall around 1200 BC.  The best known early Pre-classic culture of Michoacán was the Chupícuaro culture. Most Chupícuaro sites are found on lake islands which can be seen as a sign of it having traits relating it to the later Purepecha cultural patterns.  In the early Classic period, ballcourts and other artifacts demonstrate a Teotihuacan influence in the Michoacán region.

Ethnohistorical sources
The most useful ethnohistorical source has been the Relación de Michoacán, written around 1540 by the Franciscan priest Fray Jeronimo de Acalá, containing translated and transcribed narratives from Purepecha noblemen.  This Relación contains parts of the "official Tarascan history" as carried down through oral tradition: one part focuses on Purepecha state religion, the second on Purepecha society, and the last on Purepecha history and the Spanish conquest.  Unfortunately the first part is only partly preserved.  Other sources include a number of small pictorial manuscripts, the best known being the Lienzo de Jucutacuto.

Foundation and expansion

In the late classic, at least two non-Purépecha ethnic groups lived around Lake Pátzcuaro: Nahuatl speakers in Jarácuaro, and some Chichimecan cultures on the northern banks, with the Nahua population being the second largest.

According to the Relación de Michoacán a visionary leader of the Purépecha named Tariácuri decided to gather the communities around Lake Pátzcuaro into one strong state. Around 1300 he undertook the first conquests and installed his sons Hiripan and Tangáxuan as lords of Ihuatzio and Tzintzuntzan respectively, himself ruling from Pátzcuari city. By the death of Taríacuri (around 1350), his lineage was in control of all the major centers around Lake Pátzcuaro. His son Hiripan continued the expansion into the area surrounding Lake Cuitzeo.

Hiripan and later his brother Tangáxuan I began to institutionalize the tributary system and consolidate the political unity of the empire. They created an administrative bureaucracy and divided responsibilities of and tributes from the conquered territories between lords and nobles. In the following years, first the sierra and then the Balsas River was incorporated into the increasingly centralized state.

Under the rule of cazonci Tzitzipandáquare a number of regions were conquered, only to be lost again by rebellions or strategic retreats when confronted with Aztec expansion. In 1460 the Iréchikwa reached the Pacific coast at Zacatula, advanced into the Toluca Valley, and also, on the northern rim, reached into the present day state of Guanajuato. In the 1470s, Aztecs under Axayacatl captured a series of frontier towns and closed in on the Purepecha heartland, but were eventually defeated. This experience prompted the Purepecha ruler to further fortify the Aztec frontier with military centers along the border, such as at Cutzamala. He also allowed Otomies and Matlatzincas who had been driven out of their homelands by the Aztecs to settle in the border area under the condition that they took part in the defense of the Purepecha lands. From 1480 the Aztec ruler Ahuitzotl intensified the conflict with the Iréchikwa. He supported attacks on Purepecha lands by other ethnic groups allied with or subjugated to the Aztecs such as Matlatzincas, Chontales, and Cuitlatecs. The Purepecha, led by the cazonci Zuangua, repelled the attacks but further Purepecha expansion was halted until the arrival of the Spaniards two years into the rule of the last cazonci of an independent Iréchikwa, Tangáxuan II.

Between 1480 and 1510, the Iréchikwa occupied parts of present day Colima and Jalisco in order to secure Nitratine (Chile saltpeter) mines in the region. Throughout the occupation, the people's of Colima, Sayula, Zapotlán, Tapalpa, and Autlán resisted Purepecha rule in the Saltpeter War. By the end of the 30 year long occupation, the Iréchikwa was forced out of the area permanently.

Religion

Like most Mesoamerican cultures, the Purépecha were polytheists who worshipped a large array of deities. Chiefly was Curicaveri/Kurikaweri, the god of the sun.

Metallurgy

West states, "The Tarascans and their neighbors near the Pacific coast were the foremost metallurgists of pre-Conquest Mexico."  This included copper, silver and gold, where Michoacán and Colima provided placer gold, Tamazula provided silver, and the La Huacana area provided copper.  Copper-silver alloy artefacts found in the palaces and graves of Tzintzuntzan include rodelas, armlets, bracelets and cups.  Copper bells made from lost-wax casting were used in religious ceremonies from 650 AD to at least 1200.  This was followed by copper-gold and copper-silver items such as discs, bracelets, diadems and masks.  Other items were made from bronze, including needles, fishhooks, tweezers, axeheads, and awls.  The religious national treasures were looted by the Spanish during the Conquest from Lake Patzcuaro graves and storerooms.

It has been speculated that Purepecha metallurgy was developed due to contact with South American cultures.

Fall of the Iréchikwa

After hearing about the fall of the Aztec Empire, cazonci Tangáxuan II sent emissaries to the Spanish victors. A few Spaniards went with them to Tzintzuntzan where they were presented to the ruler and gifts were exchanged. They returned with samples of gold and Cortés' interest in the Iréchikwa was awakened. In 1522 a Spanish force under the leadership of Cristóbal de Olid was sent into Purepecha territory and arrived at Tzintzuntzan within days. The Purepecha army numbered many thousands, perhaps as many as 100,000, but at the crucial moment they chose not to fight. Tangáxuan submitted to the Spanish administration, but for his cooperation was allowed a large degree of autonomy. This resulted in a strange arrangement where both Cortés and Tangáxuan considered themselves rulers of Michoacán for the following years: the population of the area paid tribute to them both. When the Spanish found out that Tangáxuan was still de facto ruler of his empire but only supplied the Spanish with a small part of the resources extracted from the population they sent the ruthless conquistador Nuño de Guzmán, who allied himself with a Purepecha noble Don Pedro Panza Cuinierángari, and the cazonci was executed on February 14, 1530. A period of violence and turbulence began. During the next decades Purepecha puppet rulers were installed by the Spanish government, but when Nuño de Guzman had been disgraced and recalled to Spain, Bishop Vasco de Quiroga was sent to the area to clean up.  He rapidly gained the respect and friendship of the natives who ceased hostilities towards the Spanish hegemony.

Notes

References

External links

 Tarascan Civilization – World History Encyclopedia
 Smu.edu: Article about the Tarascan state — by Julie Adkins.

Mesoamerican cultures
Pre-Columbian cultures
History of Michoacán
History of Guanajuato
History of Guerrero
History of Jalisco
14th century in Mexico
15th century in Mexico
16th century in Mexico
States and territories established in the 14th century
14th-century establishments in Mexico
States and territories disestablished in 1530
1530s disestablishments in Mexico
1530 in New Spain
16th-century disestablishments in New Spain
Former empires in the Americas
Former countries in North America